Chattamtho Poratam is a 1985 Telugu language film starring Chiranjeevi.

Cast
 Chiranjeevi
 Madhavi
 Sumalatha
 Rao Gopal Rao
 Allu Rama Lingaiah
 Nutan Prasad
 Suthi Veerabhadra Rao
 Chalapathi Rao
 Silk Smitha
 Sakshi Ranga Rao
 Narra Venkateswara Rao
 Kaikala Satyanarayana
 Annapoorna

Soundtrack
 "Nenoka Chilakala Kolikini Chusanu"
 "Pilla Pilla Pilla Pelli Kaani Pilla"
 "Chesedi Emundi Chekka Bhajana"
 "Kanchaare Kanchaare Kancha"
 "Kadalirandi Kanaka Durga Laara"

Legacy 
The film's title was one of tentative titles for the Mahesh Babu-starrer Spyder.

References

External links

1985 films
Films directed by K. Bapayya
Films scored by K. Chakravarthy
1980s Telugu-language films
Telugu films remade in other languages